Vitry-le-François station (French: Gare de Vitry-le-François) is a railway station serving the town Vitry-le-François, Marne department, eastern France. It is situated on the Paris–Strasbourg railway.

References

External links
 

Railway stations in Marne (department)